"Neutron Dance" is a song written by Allee Willis and Danny Sembello which was introduced by the Pointer Sisters on their 1983 album Break Out. The song became a Top Ten hit in 1985, its success augmented by being prominently featured on the soundtrack of motion picture Beverly Hills Cop.

Background
According to Allee Willis, "Neutron Dance" was written in hopes of being placed on the soundtrack of the film Streets of Fire: "We were told that there was a scene on a bus that was leaving town after there had been this nuclear holocaust, and that a '50s doo-wop black group was going to be at the back of the bus that the lead couple was escaping on ... Danny Sembello and I just met that day ... I was very disinterested in songwriting at that point, and I'm writing with this kid who's never had a record before, and I just wanted to get him in and out".

"He was a phenomenal keyboard player, and I just said: 'Play the most common sounding old fashioned '50s black music bass line that you can think of.' And he just started doing the [rhythm for "Neutron Dance"]. And I'm someone who could write a melody to a spoon falling on the table. So I literally sang that melody down. First time down, he just kind of followed and went to the right places. And then I said, Let's just write this quick lyric ... we're taking a half an hour on the lyric, and this thing's gonna get done."

Willis adds that the lyric theme of "Neutron Dance" was due to "all this stuff going on in my life: I don't want to take it anymore, I'll just stay here locked behind the door. Just no time to stop and get away, because I work so hard to make it every day. Really a lyric about all these things falling apart in your life, and you know what, just get it together and change your life." 

According to Willis while working on the lyrics with Sembello she looked through a window and saw someone attempting to break into her car: while running outside to scare off the thief Willis called out to Sembello: "Someone stole my brand new Chevrolet", and the line was included in the song.

Released at the height of the Cold War, "Neutron Dance" was misinterpreted by the Russian Government as a song about nuclear war.

The Pointer Sisters version / Beverly Hills Cop
"Neutron Dance" featuring Ruth Pointer on lead vocal was introduced on the Pointer Sisters' October 1983 album release Break Out; Ruth Pointer would recall: "When I first heard 'Neutron Dance' I didn't want to sing it. I liked [its] rhythm and vigorous arrangement but to me the word 'neutron' had a violent connotation on account of the neutron bomb then so much in the news." Ruth Pointer recalls suggesting to Allee Willis that the song's lyric be modified: "she told me to quit overthinking it and just sing the damn song! Luckily I shut up and listened. I gave 'Neutron Dance' a gospel feel and nailed it in a few takes."

Despite four singles being released from Break Out in its initial year of release "Neutron Dance" was issued as a single in November 1984, the major factor in the track's single release being the placement of the song on the soundtrack of the upcoming film Beverly Hills Cop which was released December 5, 1984. In Beverly Hills Cop, "Neutron Dance" was prominently featured during a key car chase sequence with whose action the song proved musically and lyrically compatible.

Allee Willis described the experience of witnessing her composition featured in the film as "mind-boggling...on that line, 'someone stole my brand new Chevrolet,' this cigarette truck that Eddie Murphy is locked up in the back of, screaming through the streets of Detroit, slams into this Chevrolet. And 'I'm just burning, doing the Neutron Dance,' which to me meant someone could push the button tomorrow and we could all go up in smoke, so make your change now. On that line, a car explodes. I mean, I couldn't have written a better song for a movie scene if my life depended on it." 

According to Ruth Pointer, although "Neutron Dance" proved effective when utilized in the rough cut of the film's car chase sequence, the producers of Beverly Hills Cop were disinclined to retain the song, instead asking Richard Perry to create a new similarly-styled track to score the car chase sequence in the completed film: however, Perry demurred opining that "Neutron Dance" was a "one in a million song."

Concurrent with the single's release, a video for "Neutron Dance" began airing on MTV. The music video stars the Pointer Sisters as discontented theatre ushers, and also features future Perfect Strangers star Bronson Pinchot as their boss and actor Gary Burghoff, best known from the M*A*S*H film and TV series, as the cinema operator; the setting was a cinema where Beverly Hills Cop was screening, allowing for the promotion of the movie via many clips from it being displayed in the video. 
Pinchot himself plays a minor role in the film as "Serge", a salesman in Jenny Summers' art gallery.

In March 1985 "Neutron Dance" became the fourth Top Ten single issued from the Break Out album rising as high as #6. It was the career zenith of the Pointer Sisters who prior to the success of "Jump (For My Love)" subsequent to that of "Automatic" – the second and third singles from Break Out – had never had back-to-back Top 20 singles. "Neutron Dance" proved to be the group's final Top Ten hit: after a sixth single release from Break Out: "Baby Come & Get It", fell short of the Top 40, "Dare Me", the lead single from the follow-up album to Break Out.

Contact, stalled at #11 and the group's sole further Top 40 charting: "Goldmine" (1986), rose no higher than #33. The Pointer Sisters just missed the Top 40 with "Be There", a track in the vein of "Neutron Dance" – co-written by Allee Willis with Franne Golde and featuring Ruth Pointer on lead – for the soundtrack of Beverly Hills Cop II, "Be There"'s peak being #42.

Popular culture references
The song was featured in The Golden Girls season four episode, "You Gotta Have Hope".  The song is performed by The Del Rubio Triplets as they auditioned for a charity benefit talent show.

Personnel 
 Ruth Pointer – lead vocals
 Anita Pointer – backing vocals
 June Pointer – backing vocals

Musicians
 Stephen Mitchell – synthesizer programming
 Howie Rice – acoustic piano, synthesizers, organ, guitars, drum machine programming, percussion
 Paul Fox – E-mu Emulator
 Reek Havoc – electronic drum programming
 Bob Mithoff – drum machine programming
 Paulinho da Costa – tambourine

Track listings
7" single
 Neutron Dance	  	3:53	
 Telegraph Your Love	4:02

Chart performance

Weekly charts

Year-end charts

References 

2. Referenced in P.M. Dawn's 1991 single Set Adrift On Memory Bliss

1984 songs
The Pointer Sisters songs
Songs written by Allee Willis
1984 singles
1985 singles
Songs written by Danny Sembello
Song recordings produced by Richard Perry
Planet Records singles
RCA Records singles
Songs about dancing
Novelty and fad dances